Eagle Foothills AVA is the second Idaho American Viticultural Area located in the southwestern part of the state, north of Boise, and a sub-region within the vast Snake River Valley AVA. It is the first appellation in Idaho. The region is located in hardiness zones 7a and 7b. Vineyard elevations are approximately below 2,000 feet.

Unique AVA
"The Sunnyslope deserves its own AVA, too," says Cunningham.  "The Snake River Valley is so vast, and certainly diverse enough, I see no reason for others not to follow."

References

External links
 3 Horse Ranch Vineyards
 Eagle Foothills Grape Growers Association 
 Idaho Wine Commission
  TTB AVA Map

Idaho wine
American Viticultural Areas